Helmsdale is a village on the east coast of Sutherland, in the Highland council area of Scotland. The modern village was planned in 1814 to resettle communities that had been removed from the surrounding straths as part of the Highland Clearances.

Toponymy
The River Helmsdale (Gaelic Ilidh) was noted by Ptolemy as Ila, which remains an obscure name.  The Gaelic name for the village, Bun Ilidh, means Ilie-foot. Norse settlers called the strath Hjalmundal, meaning Dale of the Helmet, from which the modern village name Helmsdale is derived.

History
The remains of Helmsdale Castle were demolished in the 1970s in order to build the new A9 road bridge.

The castle was the location of the murder of John Gordon, 11th Earl of Sutherland and his Countess, Marion Seton, in 1567. They were poisoned by Isobel Sinclair, the wife of Gordon of Gartly. Isobel Sinclair's own son also died, but the fifteen year old heir of Sutherland, Alexander Gordon was unharmed. He was made to marry the Earl of Caithness' daughter Barbara Sinclair. In 1569 he escaped from the Sinclairs to Huntly Castle.

The previous bridge, which still stands, was designed by Thomas Telford and completed in 1811.

The last force-fire in Helmsdale was in about 1818.

Gold rush
Two tributaries of the river were the scene of a gold rush in 1869. The history of Kildonan's gold started in 1818, when a single nugget of gold was found near the Suisgill and Kildonan burns. 
Late in 1868, a brief announcement in a local newspaper stated that gold had been discovered at Kildonan in the county of Sutherland. The credit for the discovery goes to Robert Nelson Gilchrist, a native of Kildonan, who had spent 17 years in the goldfields of Australia. On his return home, the Duke of Sutherland gave him permission to pan the gravels of the Helmsdale River, and he prospected all the burns and tributaries.

World War II and after
During World War II, the Royal Air Force built Loth Chain Home radar station at Crakaig, a few miles south-west of Helmsdale. During the Cold War there was a Composite Signals Organisation (CSO) radio monitoring station in Helmsdale itself. The CSO is associated with GCHQ.

Recent developments
On 3 August 2008, the Highlands and Islands Council announced plans to modernise and catalyse industry in Helmsdale and its surrounding areas. This included a £3.5 million revamp of the harbour and the development of two battery processing factories. Work on the harbour was set to begin in spring 2009, while the battery plants were expected to open before May 2009. It was hoped up to 50 new jobs would be created.

Location and transport

The village is on the A9 road, at a junction with the A897 to Melvich, and has a railway station on the Far North Line. Buses operate about every two hours from Monday to Saturday and infrequently on Sundays from Helmsdale to Brora, Golspie, Dornoch, Tain and Inverness in the south and Berriedale, Dunbeath, Halkirk, Thurso and Scrabster in the north. These are on routes X98 and X99 and are operated by Stagecoach Highlands, but tickets can be bought on the Citylink website.

Tourism, culture and sport
Facilities in Helmsdale include an independent youth hostel, a heritage centre, an art gallery, and an inn.

Helmsdale hosts a Highland Games which are held on the third Saturday in August each year. For the evening Marquee Dance the village population of 700 doubles thanks to visitors attending the dance.

Helmsdale is home to Bunillidh Thistle F.C. and Helmsdale United.

Economy
Helmsdale is a fishing port at the estuary of the River Helmsdale. It was once the home of one of the largest herring fleets in Europe.

People from Helmsdale
Professor Andrew Rutherford CBE (1929–1998), Vice-Chancellor of the University of London from 1994 to 1997.
David Mackay (pilot), Chief Pilot of Virgin Galactic, and a former test pilot. Became the 569th person to enter space and the first Scots-born astronaut.
Edwyn Collins, singer from band Orange Juice, who also had notable solo success with the song "A Girl Like You", resides in the village.

See also
 Badbea clearance village

References

External links

Helmsdale Community Website

Helmsdale
Populated places in Sutherland
Gold rushes
Mining communities in Scotland